Lystrup station is a railway station serving the railway town and suburb of Lystrup north of the city of Aarhus in Jutland, Denmark.

The station is located on the Grenaa railway line between Aarhus and Grenaa. It opened in 1877 with the opening of the Aarhus-Ryomgård section of the railway line. Since 2019, the station has been served by the Aarhus light rail system, a tram-train network combining tram lines in the city of Aarhus with operation on railway lines in the surrounding countryside.

See also 
 List of railway stations in Denmark

References

External links

 Aarhus Letbane
 Midttrafik

Railway stations in the Central Denmark Region
Railway stations opened in 1877
Railway stations in Denmark opened in the 19th century